Hum Tehray Gunahgaar was a 2014 Soap series that aired on Hum TV. Series was written by Zoha Hassan, directed by Ali Masud Saeed and produced by Momina Duraid of MD Productions. It stars Danish Taimoor, Ushna Shah, Farhan Ali Agha, Jia Ali, Mansha Pasha, Mohsin Gillani, Sarah Khan, Anoushay Abbasi. At 3rd Hum Awards series was nominated for three categories, winning only Best Soap Actor award for Danish Taimoor tied with Imran Aslam for Susraal Mera It also aired in India as prime-time soap on Zee Zindagi

Outline
Gunehgaar is the story of a successful businessman Zakaria, his kind and cancer-stricken wife Aisha, their kids and two adopted children. Zakaria's adopted son Ramal Ali is in love with Malaika and on Malaika's father's insistence, the couple secretly gets married. Owing to her deteriorating condition, Aisha takes some decisions for her children which bring major upheavals in their lives.

Cast

 Danish Taimoor 
 Ushna Shah 
 Farhan Ali Agha
 Jia Ali 
 Mansha Pasha 
 Jinaan Hussain as Neha
 Nazli Nasr as Ayesha
 Raeed Muhammad Alam as Waqar aka Vicky
 Mohsin Gillani
 Birjees Farooqui as Ammi Ji
 Sarah Khan
 Anoushay Abbasi

Accolades 

At 3rd Hum Awards soap was nominated for following nominations:

 Best Soap Actor - Danish Taimoor  (Won) 
 Best Soap Actress - Ushna Shah  (nom)
 Best Soap Series - Momina Duraid (nom)

References

External links
 official website 
 

2014 Pakistani television series debuts
2014 Pakistani television series endings
Pakistani drama television series
Urdu-language television shows
Hum TV original programming